Goonj is a 1989 Indian Hindi-language film directed by Jalal Agha and produced by Joy Augustine, starring Kumar Gaurav, Juhi Chawla and Tinnu Anand.

Cast
 Kumar Gaurav as Sanjeev Kamat 
 Juhi Chawla as Sangeeta Kalekar
 Tinnu Anand as Father Mario
 Binju Ali as Peter Samuel
 Ashutosh Gowariker as Sammy
 Sulabha Arya as Mrs. Kamat
 Joy Augustine as Inspector Bandodkar
 Aghaa

Soundtrack

Awards and nominations
 Nominated for Filmfare Award for Best Story (1990)

References

External links 
 

1989 films
1980s Hindi-language films
Films set in Goa